Rhopiella is a genus of starfish in the family Echinasteridae in the order Spinulosida.

Species
The following species is recognised by the World Register of Marine Species:

Rhopiella hirsuta (Koehler, 1920)

References

Echinasteridae